Pageant Material is the second studio album by American country music artist Kacey Musgraves, released June 23, 2015, through Mercury Nashville. Musgraves co-wrote all 13 tracks and co-produced the album with Luke Laird and Shane McAnally. The album made numerous "Best Albums of 2015" lists and was nominated for Best Country Album at the 58th Grammy Awards.

Recording
Most of Pageant Material was recorded live in Nashville's historic RCA Studio A. In an interview with The Boot published May 21, 2015, Musgraves describes the recording process: "We recorded most everything in a big circle in one of my favorite old studios on the planet – historic RCA Studio A in Nashville. That lent itself to the record having that concise feel that we wanted. Then we added a 10-piece string section later."

Promotion and packaging
Promotional appearances in the media to support the album included performances on The Tonight Show Starring Jimmy Fallon (June 9, 2015), Late Night with Seth Meyers (June 10, 2015), Good Morning America (June 23, 2015), The View (June 24, 2015), Jimmy Kimmel Live! (September 14, 2015), The Late Show with Stephen Colbert (January 8, 2016) and The Late Late Show with James Corden (April 6, 2016). On June 26, 2015, Musgraves performed "Follow Your Arrow" for National Public Radio's Tiny Desk Concerts in support of the legalization of same-sex marriage in the United States, which took place on the same day.

To further support the album, Musgraves embarked on the Kacey Musgraves Country & Western Rhinestone Revue concert tour. Described as a "throwback country" tour, dates on the first leg included locations across the United States and Europe. The first leg of the tour began on August 27, 2015, in Atlanta, Georgia, and concluded on November 22, 2015, in Amsterdam, Netherlands. The second leg of the tour, which spanned portions of the US, UK and Ireland began in Dallas, TX on January 21, 2016, and concluded in Columbia, MO, on April 30, 2016.

Musgraves' younger sister, Kelly Christine Sutton, is credited with the album cover's photograph and design.

Critical reception

Pageant Material received positive reviews from music critics. At Metacritic, which assigns a normalized rating out of 100 to reviews from mainstream critics, the album has an average score of 78 out of 100, which indicates "generally favorable reviews" based on 25 reviews.

Writing for Hits Daily Double, Lenny Beer and Simon Glickman called Pageant Material an "album for the ages," comparing its greatness to Adele's 21, and added, "it's a nearly perfect set." Glamour's Alexandra Schwartz called the album "nearly flawless" and listed it among the best albums of 2015. Paul Grein of HITS Daily Double predicted the album would be in contention for Album of the Year at the 58th Annual Grammy Awards. Stephen Thomas Erlewine of AllMusic rated the album four out of five stars and states: "Pageant Material favors softness, sometimes nearly swooning in its slowness, especially on the gorgeous keynote "High Time" and the closer "Fine," both so deliberate and hazy they evoke memories of lazy high-school dances." Billboards Rob Tannenbaum's four and a half stars out of five review claimed it is "an even better album than her last, with more consistency and variety." Glenn Gamboa of Newsday rated the album an "A", calling it "great stories told extraordinarily well," and "nothing short of a musical miracle" in today's country music climate. Additionally, it was the Spin "album of the week" and called a "sophomore masterpiece" by reviewer Brennan Carley.

Accolades

Commercial performance
Pageant Material debuted at number three on the US Billboard 200 chart with 60,000 equivalent album units; it sold 55,000 copies in its first week, with the remainder of its unit total reflecting the album's streaming activity and track sales. It marked Musgraves' best week of album sales to date. As of September 2016, the album has sold 179,400 copies in the US.

Track listing
All tracks are produced by Luke Laird, Shane McAnally, and Kacey Musgraves.

Notes
"Are You Sure" is a part of track 13 on CD pressings of the album (giving track 13 a length of 7:50), but a separate track on all other digital platforms. On all versions of the album, "Fine" ends at 3:37 and is followed by 18 seconds of silence.

Personnel
Credits adapted from AllMusic and liner notes.

Musicians
 David Angell – violin
 Monisa Angell – viola
 Misa Arriaga – acoustic guitar, baritone guitar, gut string guitar, shaker, background vocals
 Zeneba Bowers – violin
 Zach Casebolt – violin
 David Davidson – violin
 Fred Eltringham – bells, drums, percussion, shaker, tambourine, biscuit pan
 Ian Fitchuk – bells, Hammond B3, harp, Mellotron, piano, Wurlitzer electric piano
 Paul Franklin – pedal steel guitar
 Natalie Hemby – background vocals
 Adam Keafer – bass, upright bass
 Anthony La Marchina – cello
 Luke Laird – acoustic guitar, electric guitar, gut string guitar, tambourine, background vocals
 Shane McAnally – background vocals
 Kacey Musgraves – acoustic guitar, vocals, whistling
 Willie Nelson – background vocals, "Trigger"
 Josh Osborne – acoustic guitar, vocals
 Kyle Ryan – banjo, electric guitar, vocals, spoon
 Lindsay Smith-Trostle – cello
 Wei Tsun Chang – violin
 Katelyn Westergard – violin 
 Kristin Wilkinson – viola
 Karen Winkelmann – violin
 Charlie Worsham – banjo, acoustic guitar, guitalele
Misa Arriaga – gang vocals on "Biscuits"
Luke Laird – gang vocals on "Biscuits"
Shane McAnally – gang vocals on "Biscuits"
Kyle Ryan – gang vocals on "Biscuits"

Technical
 Ryan Gore – engineer, mixing
 Kelsey Granda – production coordination
 Gena Johnson – assistant engineer
 Luke Laird – producer, programming
 Jordan Lehning – conductor, string arrangements
 Shane McAnally – producer
 Andrew Mendelson – mastering
 Kacey Musgraves – producer
 Karen Naff – design
 Jarod Snowden – editing
 Kelly Christine Sutton – art direction, design, photography
 Stephanie Wright – A&R

Charts

Weekly charts

Year-end charts

Release history

References

2015 albums
Kacey Musgraves albums
Mercury Nashville albums
Albums produced by Shane McAnally
Alternative country albums by American artists
Country pop albums